George Armour (24 April 1812 – 13 June 1881) was a Scottish American businessman and philanthropist known for his contributions to the global distribution process for commodities. He is credited with developing the grain elevator system, establishing grain trading standards as director and president of the Chicago Board of Trade (CBT), founding the Chicago, Burlington and Quincy Railroad (CBQ), Commercial Club of Chicago, YMCA of Chicago, Merchants' Loan & Trust Company (MLTC), the precursor to Continental Illinois, and the Chicago Academy of Fine Arts which later became the School of the Art Institute of Chicago and Art Institute of Chicago. He served as a director of several notable companies during his career.

As founder of Armour, Dole & Co and other firms, he created the first extensive system of large mechanized grain elevators in Chicago and thus enabled the shipment of grains from the American Midwest to destinations all over the world. During his tenure, the CBT standardized the grading and selling of grains and established the first commodity futures markets. He was "popularly known as the father of the grain elevator system" or as a "rapacious, blood sucking insect."

Early life 

George Armour was born on 24 April 1812, in Campbeltown, Scotland, on the Mull of Kintyre.
Armour was a wheelwright and worked his way across the ocean as a shipboard cooper or carpenter.

In 1834, Armour with his brother John and cousin James a shoemaker, left Campbeltown and made a voyage to Ottawa, Illinois.
Soon after their arrival in Ottawa, the brothers went north to what was then known as the "Argyle Settlement" near Rockford, Illinois.
The brothers built a 14' x 14' cabin in hopes of establishing a timber and prairie land claim, but "farming was not to their liking."

In 1836, while on a trip to back to Scotland, the brothers helped their friend John Greenlee and his family escape from Campbeltown in order to avoid Greenlee being arrested by one of the Duke of Argyll's tax collectors.
After the escape, the brothers furnished the Greenlees with passage to the US and set up the Greenlees in the cabin they had built in the Argyle Settlement. Subsequently, Armour lived in Joliet and Lockport, Illinois, and entered the business of merchandising.
At the time, both cities were expanding rapidly because of the construction of the Illinois and Michigan Canal. 
Lockport became headquarters for building the canal in 1837.

Later Armour became a sub-contractor with George Steel. Steel was born in Forfarshire, Scotland in 1797 and arrived in Chicago in 1837. Steel had come to the US on contract for building a section of the Illinois & Michigan Canal but the work had stopped in the aftermath of the Panic of 1837. 
Steel and Armour built a section of the Illinois and Michigan Canal sometime between 1836 and 1848.
They also built a portion of the CBQ. The railroad was constructed starting in March 1848 and was completed in 1853.
Armour was a contractor for 16 miles (out of 181 miles) of road grading for the ROCK which started construction in 1851 and was completed by 1854. Armour most likely also worked on the Galena and Chicago Union Railroad – the first railroad built west of Chicago and a highly profitable venture that established William B. Ogden and George Smith as major figures in Chicago history. Smith operated a "wildcat bank" that issued scrip which was used to pay workers – including Armour's employees.

In the early 1850s, Armour resettled in Chicago. His brother John Armour remained in Ottawa where he became a successful businessman. Of John Armour's many investments, one that remains is Armour's Warehouse built in 1861. In contrast, George Armour – in the following thirty years – went from being a foreman to being one of the richest and most influential businessmen in America.

Prospering in Chicago 

In Chicago, Armour reunited with George Steel – who had become a prosperous Chicago businessman. In 1852–1853 Steel was president of Chicago Board of Trade. In 1856, a new three-story building was erected on Steel's site: an office and warehouse located at the foot of LaSalle Street on South Street and this became the first permanent home for the CBT. Armour was an early member of the CBT and also commenced what became his signature venture – the erection and management of grain elevators.

Prior to Armour's efforts there had been a small number of what may be termed "grain elevators" constructed in the United States. Dart's Elevator was the world's first steam-powered grain elevator. It was designed and built by Joseph Dart and Robert Dunbar in 1842 in Buffalo, New York.
The first large steam elevator ever built in Chicago for handling grain from railroad tracks was on the North side, on the Chicago River, west of Wells Street. It was built by George A Gibbs and E W Griffin of Gibbs, Griffin & Company in 1854. It might also have been known as the Chicago & Galena Union Railroad Elevator. 

In 1854 George Steel took over a warehouse and built another grain elevator just west of the Gibbs, Griffin and Company warehouse. It was capable of operating from the canal as well as the railroads. The elevator had a capacity of 100,000 bushels and was located at Franklin and River streets – in the Chicago & Galena Union Railroad track on North Water Street.

In that year Steel's warehouse burnt down and Steel sold the property to Wesley Munger and George Armour. Munger had owned a small mill at Waukegan, which had burned down. As Munger & Armour, they built the first modern, steam-driven grain elevator in Chicago. The grain elevator was completed in 1855 and had a capacity of 300,000 bushels.

Armour's influence as a Chicago businessman grew and Armour was first elected a director of the CBT in 1856.

In 1860 he joined with Charles Sydney Dole, James Henry Doyle and Wesley Munger and they formed Armour, Dole & Co. The company operated grain elevators at the depot of the CBQ with a capacity of 850,000 bushels. After the American Civil War, Armour, Dole & Co. remained among the city's leading grain warehousers. Their elevators had a combined capacity of 2.1 million bushels in 1871. By the early 1880s, this figure had grown to 6.3 million bushels.

In 1863, Hiram Wheeler  entered the Munger & Armour, which then became Munger, Wheeler & Co. Armour remained a partner. The company owned large grain elevators next to the depot of the Chicago & North Western Railroad.

At the Chicago Canal Convention of 1863, Armour was a member of the CBT delegation. 
The Convention proceedings called for laws and budgets to widen and deepen the Illinois and Michigan Canal and thus make it possible for ships to sail between the Great Lakes and the Mississippi River.

Enablers of success 
In order to succeed with a vision of moving of very numerous bushels of grain, Armour needed more than steam powered conveyor belts. He needed:

 Products that could be graded for quality according to industry-standards
 Banks that did not fail and supported stable currencies
 Futures exchange where contracts to buy specific quantities of a commodity or financial instrument at a specified price with delivery set at a specified time in the future

Industry-standard grading systems for grains 
Through the 1830s sacks or barrels or even buckets of grain were hoisted off vessels and into warehouses by manpower – sometimes even using bucket brigades. The amounts of grain being moved in a contract were measured in the thousands of bushels. By the 1840s a certain amount of bulk transport was taking place and grain was stored in individual bins according to source in warehouses and the heavy lifting was done by block and tackle pulled by horses. By 1848 the horse was replaced by a steam engine, but not the block and tackle. The amounts being moved were in the tens of thousands of bushels. If the transport of grain was to move into the hundreds of thousands of bushels then changes were needed.

When grains from multiple sources were to be co-mingled in silos holding hundred of thousands of bushels, then methods of grading and inspecting the quality of the grain are required. The CBT had been concerned with grading and inspecting products since the day it was founded. In 1856 Armour was elected to the Board of Directors of the CBT. In the same year, his partner Charles Dole was charged to set up a committee with the purpose of establishing grades by the separation of wheat into three industry-standard grades. By 1858 the grading and inspecting standards were established and compliance mechanisms set up. In 1859, the CBT received a state charter that enabled it to enforce grading standards and inspections with a legally binding basis.

Banks that do not fail 
In banking, the period 1837 to 1863 is known as the "Free Banking" era. It was a period of "Wildcat Banks". In the Panic of 1837, out of 850 banks in the United States, 343 closed entirely, 62 failed partially. If Armour's business was to prosper, he needed a bank that would not fail. In 1857, along with Cyrus McCormick, who invented the reaper, and Chicago's first mayor, William B. Ogden, Armour was a founder and, later, elected director of the Merchants' Loan and Trust Company. The book published by MLTC in 1907 titled Fifty Years of Banking in Chicago identified the banks' early mission:

Fixed pricing by using futures contracts 
In 1865 the CBT recognized the futures contract as a legitimate feature of trades and full rules were first established. Given the increase in pricing certainty around the globe, Chicago grain elevator operators became free to construct grain elevators with capacities of millions of bushels.

And more 
While the above three conditions may have been paramount in developing the grain warehousing business, there were a number of other hurdles to be cleared. The technology for moving grain had to improve and he development or trains, vessels and conveyors continued its rapid progress in typical nineteenth century fashion. Perhaps the most significant less obvious aspect was that the site and logistics planning for the warehouses needed to be just right: warehouses needed to have navigable water on one side and railroads on the other side. The navigable waters needed to give vessels access to any other port in the world. The railroads needed to reach tens of thousands of farms to the west as well to the major consumer cities on the East coast.

Armour fully recognized the site and logistics planning needs. He was a supporter of the railroads and was a stockholder in the CBQ, the Chicago & Northwestern, and the Chicago Milwaukee and St Paul Railroads. Later he was a director of the ROCK. He was probably one of the few shareholders that had actually laid track. On the canal side, at the Chicago Canal Convention of 1863, Armour was a member of the CBT delegation – most likely one of the few members that had actually dug a canal.

Because of the likelihood of dust explosions, grain warehouses were frequent venues for fires. Armour also foresaw the need for fully funded insurance. He was a local director of the Liverpool & London & Globe Insurance Company, a director of the Chicago Mutual Insurance Company and a director of the Merchants Insurance Company.

By 1870 the remaining impediments to growth were less about the technology and more about legal and political matters. In 1870 the Chicago Tribune reported:

Chicago Fire and after 

The Great Chicago Fire "was a conflagration that burned from Sunday, 8 October, to early Tuesday, 10 October 1871. The fire killed up to 300 people, destroyed roughly 3.3 square miles (9 km2) of Chicago, Illinois, and left more than 100,000 residents homeless." Armour and his partners apparently came through physically unscathed but their various business affairs were totally disrupted. The offices of Armour, Dole and Co, Munger & Wheeler were destroyed as well as Armour, Dole & Co Elevator "A", the MLTC offices, the Merchants Insurance Company offices – which were exploded to make a fire break that failed – and the CBT offices.

The story of how the MLTC was able to move the bank's funds at the height of the fire is well-described in The Advancement of Chicago as a Financial Center up to the Close of the Nineteenth Century. Also described was the setting up of an improvised bank in Solomon A Smith's dining room on Monday, 9 October and recreating all the accounts even with all the banks and most of the customer's records had been destroyed.

The Munn & Scott affair occurred, starting in 1872. See below.

In 1875, Armour was elected president of the CBT. During his tenure, on 14 January, the King of Hawaii visited the CBT trading floor and a racist incident occurred. It was covered in detail by the Chicago Tribune. Also during the year, for the first time, memberships could be bought and sold and a committee was instituted to report of the recommendation of situating a US mint in Chicago. The report was an added as an appendix to the CBT annual report.

There were few further impediments to growth. By 1885, the capacity of the Armour, Dole & Co grain elevators was 6,350,000 bushels with a total shipping and receiving capacity of 1,500,000 per day.

Munn & Scott affair 

The Munn & Scott grain-warehousing company was founded in 1844 in Spring Bay, Illinois, north of Peoria. By 1856, Ira Y. Munn and his partners owned a large Chicago grain elevator with a capacity of 200,000 bushels. George L. Scott joined the enterprise in 1858, and the name was changed name to Munn & Scott. By the end of the Civil War, the company owned four Chicago grain elevators with a total capacity of 2.3 million bushels, nearly a third of the total capacity of all of the city's large elevators.

Munn served as president of the Chicago Board of Trade and as president of the city's Chamber of Commerce in 1868. Annual revenues reached about $4 million in 1867; by 1870, the company ranked as the city's leading grain warehouse.

By 1868 Munn & Scott and four other firms – including Armour, Dole and Co – dominated the Chicago grain elevator landscape. They were interlocked in a business pool, each owning part interest in each of the others.
Therefore, they could fix prices and carry out dirty tricks that included fraudulent grading, dishonest weighing, mixing grades, restricting competition, hiding storage information, and issuing false receipts.
Joseph Medill, whose newspaper made warehouse regulation its cause, put it colorfully:

The Munn & Scott firm was both a prime cause of complaints and a leader in the fight against effective control by the CBT. In the summer of 1872, the firm was exposed as having massively cheated clients using multiple methods. It was learned that Munn & Scott grain receipts totaling 300,000 bushels were not backed by grain. Had the Munn & Scott matter had been allowed to take its course, it would have created a panic which would have extended throughout the whole Northwest. Armour, a silent partner in the firm, could probably have entirely escaped, or evaded, any personal responsibility in the matter. Instead, Armour purchased the Munn interests for $10 and quietly set about purchasing grain to make its receipts good.

When a reporter from The Tribune interviewed him on the subject, Armour declined to say anything in reference to it, but requested as a special favor that no noise be made about it in the paper. He had merely done his duty, he said, and it might interfere with the country's business if it were written up in the newspapers.

By this time, the Munn & Scott firm had gone bankrupt in a grain speculation deal, and Ira Munn and George Scott both found that they were now strictly employees of Armour himself.

In the same year, Munn & Scott was charged with violating new Illinois regulations that enabled the state to inspect and regulate the elevators. Munn and his company achieved their most lasting fame in 1876–77, when the US Supreme Court in Munn v. Illinois rejected Munn's argument that the state had no right to regulate privately owned enterprises such as grain elevators.

Following the demise of Munn & Scott and the enactment of new laws and the addition to CBT regulations, the dislike of the "warehousemen" seemed to diminish. There continued to be fraudulent behaviors and attempts were made to corner markets but these appear to have been more the actions of rogue individuals and not due to underlying structural flaws in the warehousing system.

Personal, political and philanthropic life 

Armour married Barbara Allison (1826–1898) in the early 1850s. She was born in Aberdeen, Scotland and emigrated to Chicago when she was very young. Their first son John was born in 1851. The first Armour home was on Michigan Avenue near Monroe Street.

The Great Chicago Fire disrupted Armour's personal life. He lost his house, his church, his children's school. He also lost civic projects he had dedicated much time to, including the YMCA, the Seaman's Bethel and Chicago Academy of Design.

After the Chicago Fire, the family built and moved into a new house at 1945 South Prairie Avenue in 1872. They also had a summer house in Waukegan, IL.

While on a voyage to Europe – made with the hope of improving his health – Armour died of rheumatism of the heart in Brighton, England on 13 June 1881. His body was returned to the US and he was buried at Graceland Cemetery in Chicago.

The arts

Gallery 

By the 1850s, the population of Chicago grew to over 110,000 inhabitants. As with many groups of people this size, the population included artisans, artists and art patrons.

Examples of a love of the arts in Chicago at the time include:
 In 1855 William B Ogden invited George Peter Alexander Healy to visit Chicago. Healy was an American portrait painter and one of the most prolific and popular painters of his day. He lived and painted in Chicago for the next fourteen years
 The first major art exhibition was held in 1859 and attracted over 12,000 visitors.
 The construction of Crosby's Opera House and its eventual success

The Armours become associated with this artistic milieu by becoming collectors and patrons. Their son John Armour died on 16 May 1865 of a rheumatic heart condition. Some time before that, John's portrait was painted by Healy. Prior to his death, the Armours traveled to Europe hoping to cure John. While in Europe a bas-relief bust of John was sculpted. Also on that voyage a portrait of Barbara Allison Armour was painted by Sir Lawrence Alma-Tadema in London in 1865.

Also of note, Armour's partner James H Dole had been very active with the Chicago Academy of Design, was a founder of the Chicago Academy of Fine Arts and supported the Art Institute until his death in 1902.

The culmination of this participation is that Armour was a founder and elected first President of the Chicago Academy of Fine Arts in 1879. The academy changed its name to the Art Institute of Chicago in 1882.

The background in the creation of the Art Institute is complex. The formation of the Institute and its origins in the Chicago Academy of Design are detailed by A T Andreas in his History of Chicago – From the Earliest Period to the Present Time. A darker side of the takeover of assets is covered by Joel S. Dryer in a presentation titled The Story You Don't Know About A Place We All Love delivered to The Chicago Literary Club 14 May 2001. Further investigations has been carried out by Kirsten M. Jensen in her book: The American Salon: The Art Gallery at the Chicago Interstate Industrial Exposition, 1873—1890.

Church obligations 
Armour was active with the Second Presbyterian Church and along with his good friend Norman Williams – a prominent Chicago lawyer. 
He was a trustee and an elder of the church. The first church was destroyed in the Chicago Fire of 1871. A new church was completed by 1874. Armour donated the tower which was completed in 1884 after Armour's death.

Armour donated $500 toward the construction of the Willow Creek Presbyterian Church in Argyle, IL in 1877.

Civic duties 
On 22 March 1858, Chicagoans again gathered in an attempt to form a YMCA. After a series of meetings, a constitution was written and the first YMCA of Chicago was officially formed. Armour was a founder and trustee of the YMCA of Chicago.

Armour was a founder and member of the Commercial Club of Chicago in 1878. A group of successful Chicago businessmen, the Commercial Club promoted the economic development of the city. The Commercial Club patterned itself after traditional civic improvement clubs, holding regular meetings to discuss pertinent reform issues of the day.

Armour dedicated a  Fountain in Campbeltown, Scotland – his birthplace – in 1881. See below.

Armour was attacked during the elections of 1857. Widespread "rioting and knockdowns" were reported in the predominantly Irish-Democratic 7th Ward in the final days of the 2 March 1857 mayoral election. The Illinois Police & Sheriff's News described the event as follows:

The only political position Armour ever held was that of elector in the Electoral College for the Hayes ticket in 1876. Special attention was called to him at the time, from the fact that his right to hold the place was challenged. It was alleged that he'd never been naturalized and consequently was ineligible. If true this would have lost Illinois one of her votes and tied the result in the Electoral College. After some difficulty, however, Armour was able to find a record of his naturalization, and he cast his vote along with his colleagues, for Hayes and Wheeler.

Legacy

Commemorations

Fountain 

The inscription reads: "the gift of George Armour, Esq, of Chicago US, a native of this town, 1881"

Tower 

The tower and bell were donated to the church and dedicated to George Armour by his family in 1884.

Streets 
 Armour RoadNamesake: George ArmourLocation: Princeton, New Jersey
 Allison RoadNamesake: Barbara Allison ArmourLocation: Princeton, New Jersey
 Campbelton RoadNamesake: George Armour birthplaceLocation: Princeton, New Jersey

Commercial and cultural

Usurpation of good deeds by the meatpackers 
Very frequently George Armour has been taken to be a brother or relative of Philip Danforth Armour.

Examples of web sites and books that erroneously indicate that George Armour was closely related to Philip Danforth Armour include the following:
 
 
 
 
 https://books.google.com/books?id=l8qJI3ak-UsC&pg=PA446
 https://books.google.com/books?id=_Vn1AwAAQBAJ&pg=PA86

Industry-standard grading and inspection 
High-fructose corn syrup as a legacy to Armour's and the CBT's efforts for setting up grading standards for grains.
Michael Pollan, American author, journalist, activist, and professor of journalism at the UC Berkeley wrote in his best-seller The Omnivore's Dilemma:

Zea mays is the predominant type of corn used to created high-fructose corn syrup.

Futures 
The CBT authorized the futures contract for wheat in 1865 – a world first. Today, futures are bought and sold for many commodities in exchanges around the world. And the CBT is a component of the largest traders of futures contracts:

A seat on the board 
In 1876, while Armour was president of the CBT, membership in the CBT went from being "by invitation only" to being memberships or a "sear" that could be bought and sold.

The practice of buying and selling seats is now followed all many exchanges and the price of a seat on the CBT has increased.

Effective movement of bulk materials 
Having taken part building some of the first railroads and canals in the US, Armour understood the need for systems that would enable the movement of bulk materials around the world. He always built his warehouses at the junctions between the two modes of transport. Today grain elevators are still built between navigable waters and railroad lines. And, even more impressive, the container terminals of the world – "where cargo containers are transshipped between different transport vehicles, for onward transportation" – all follow the same planning that George Armour used.

Military-industrial complex 
Just at the beginning of the Civil War, a meeting was called by CBT with the express purpose of funding the establishment of a brigade to support the Union side. Most of the units were infantry, but there were also zouaves and cavalry. In those days the most prestigious units were cavalry. Given that CBT members were among the most prosperous men of the city, it might seen logical that they would sponsor a cavalry unit, but no they formed an artillery unit – a unit that could use products made in Chicago by their own members. The legacy is that today we call this the military-industrial complex – "an informal alliance between a nation's military and the arms industry which supplies it, seen together as a vested interest which influences public policy. A driving factor behind this relationship between the government and defense-minded corporations is that both sides benefit—one side from obtaining war weapons, and the other from being paid to supply them."

Non-sectarian support 
Armour was a devout Presbyterian and an elder of his church. The development of his business, however, depended on people of all faiths who were healthy in "mind, body and spirit". An early effort to provide education, fitness and development that superseded religious boundaries was the YMCA. Armour was a trustee of Farwell Hall – which housed the early Chicago YMCA – in 1861 and then he was elected a director of the YMCA itself in 1867. Today the YMCA of Metro Chicago has 23 centers, five camps and hundreds of extension sites to meet the changing needs of the more than 200,000 members served every year.

He also seems to have been involved with the what is now the Bethel African Methodist Episcopal Church – Chicago's third oldest Black church.

Art of this country 
In the 19th century, The cities of the East Coast built museums that imported European works and work by Americans who had been educated in Europe. From the get go, Chicago committed to patronizing art created by American artists. In 1879, with Armour as its first president, the Art Institute of Chicago was founded as a museum built upon an art school – the School of the Art Institute of Chicago. The school trained students to create art, the museum displayed their work. This example has been followed by few other cities. Nonetheless, today the Art Institute is the second largest museum in the United States and at the same time the school is one of top graduate art schools in the US.

Maintaining heritage 
He was a significant contributor to the construction of the Willow Creek Church in Argyle IL where he had spent the summer of 1836 building he 14' x 14' log cabin. He returned to Campbeltown in the 1880s and donated the funds to build a fountain. In helping create the Art Institute, the grain warehousing business and associated transportation, Armour was part of creating the American heritages of the future, but he never forgot his own humble roots.

Integrity and modesty 
Andreas' History of Chicago, the MLTC's Fifty Years of Banking in Chicago, Taylor's History of the Board of Trade of the City of Chicago, the Encyclopaedia of Biography of Illinois provide biographies for hundreds of Chicago individuals, but none of these works – even when they mention him many times – include a biography for George Armour.

In helping the Greenlees escape the avaricious tax collector, in making good Munn & Scott's bogus receipts so farmers would not get hurt and banging his gavel hard when there's a racist incident occurring in the trading pit, we have a glimpse of a man living the American way.

Descendants 
 Son: Allison Vincent Armour
 Grandson: Norman Armour

See also 
 Chicago, Rock Island and Pacific Railroad and associated song Rock Island Line
 CME Group
 School of the Art Institute of Chicago

Notes

References

Sources

Books

Newspapers

Online sources

External links

 The Art Institute of Chicago – history
 The Commercial Club of Chicago – History
 Peoples Gas – History
 YMCA of Chicago – History
 Willow Creek Presbyterian Church of Argyle – Our history

1812 births
1881 deaths
Businesspeople from Chicago
History of Chicago
Chicago Board of Trade
Art Institute of Chicago
Philanthropists from Illinois
Museum founders
Grain elevators
Founders of schools in the United States
Scottish emigrants to the United States
People from Campbeltown
19th-century Scottish people
Illinois Republicans
American Presbyterians
Burials at Graceland Cemetery (Chicago)
Educators from Illinois
YMCA leaders
19th-century American businesspeople
19th-century American educators
19th-century American philanthropists